Cardamine is a large, broadly distributed genus of flowering plants in the mustard family, Brassicaceae. , there are around 230 accepted species in Kew's Plants of the World Online. An additional 31 new species found in New Zealand were described in 2017 but are not listed in the Plants of the World Online database.

Named hybrids include:
 Cardamine × ambigua O.E.Schulz
 Cardamine × digenea (Gremli) O.E.Schulz
 Cardamine × enriquei Marhold, Lihová & Perný
 Cardamine × grafiana O.E.Schulz
 Cardamine × insueta Urbanska-Worytkiewicz
 Cardamine × keckii A.Kern.
 Cardamine × killiasii (Brügger) Brügger
 Cardamine × paxiana O.E.Schulz
 Cardamine × rhodopaea Ancev
 Cardamine × schulzii Urbanska-Worytkiewicz
 Cardamine × undulata De Laramb. & Timb.-Lagr.
 Cardamine × wettsteiniana O.E.Schulz

References

L
Cardamine